Christian Louis Cooke (born 15 September 1987) is an English actor. He is known for playing Luke Kirkwall in Where the Heart Is, Luke Rutherford in Demons, Dorian Gaudain in Trinity, Freddie Taylor in Cemetery Junction and Len Matthews in the Channel 4 mini series The Promise. Cooke's most recent roles include ex-soldier Graham Connor in Crackle's original drama The Art of More and Mickey Argyll in BBC's three-part adaptation of Agatha Christie novel Ordeal by Innocence.

His other television roles have included Echo Beach (2008), Magic City (2012–13) and Witches of East End (2014). His other film roles have included Mercutio in Romeo & Juliet (2013), Electricity (2014), Love, Rosie (2014) and Drunk Wedding (2015).

Early life and education
Cooke was born in Leeds, West Yorkshire. He attended St Mary's Menston Catholic Voluntary Academy. He has an older brother, Alexander, a younger sister, Gabrielle, and is a first cousin to Mel B from the Spice Girls through his mother, Di, who is sister to Mel's mother, Andrea Brown.

Cooke began his acting career at the age of 10 when he appeared in a production of Bedazzled at the Bingley Arts Centre. His first television appearance was in a commercial for Birds Eye beef burgers, shortly followed by his first lead role as Wilmot Tanner in Granada Television series Wilmot. His career progressed from there.

Career
Cooke played the role of Luke Kirkwall from 2000 to 2006 in the ITV drama Where the Heart Is and guest starred in Doctors, Barking!, The Royal, Casualty & Inspector George Gently. In 2007, he starred in one episode of BBC's Robin Hood as Will Scarlett's younger brother Luke and made his film debut in the short film Wish.

Cooke also appeared in BBC One's The Chase and played Brae Marrack in the ITV1 soap opera Echo Beach. He guest-starred in the Doctor Who episodes "The Sontaran Stratagem" and "The Poison Sky", playing UNIT soldier Ross Jenkins, in 2008.

During 2009, he played the lead roles of Luke Rutherford in ITV1's supernatural drama Demons & Lord Dorian Gaudain in ITV2's eight-part drama Trinity, where he had several rear nude scenes in its first episode, and appeared in Syfy's television film Dark Relic the following year. He went on to play the lead role of Freddie Taylor in Cemetery Junction and starred in the critically acclaimed Channel 4 four-part drama The Promise, directed by Peter Kosminsky in 2011. 
That same year, Cooke made his directorial debut in Chandide, an independent short film based in London written & produced by Trinity co-star Arnab Chanda, who also starred in the lead role, before completing Paramount Pictures' romantic comedy Drunk Wedding. The following year, he featured in 1950s Miami-set drama series, Magic City, which came to a close after two seasons in August 2013.

Cooke's film career has since grown in the form of two collaborations with director Bryn Higgins, titled Unconditional and Electricity, starring alongside Charlie Cox in British independent Hello Carter, playing Mercutio in Carlo Carlei's Romeo and Juliet and starring alongside Lily Collins in British-American romantic comedy Love, Rosie. He also made a return to short films, starring in Nativity-inspired Anomaly before taking the lead in Fare with Maimie McCoy, and has since featured regularly throughout the second season of American television series Witches of East End  before Lifetime announced the show's cancellation in November 2014.

Spring 2015 saw Cooke return to British television in BBC two-part book-adaptation drama Stonemouth, the first adaptation of Iain Banks' work since his death in 2013, opposite Sharon Small, Gary Lewis & Peter Mullan, as well as the announcement of Magic Citys movie adaptation starring alongside Bruce Willis & Bill Murray, reprising his role as Danny Evans. On top of his return to British television, his role as Stewart Gilmour in Stonemouth marked his return to a lead role, and towards the summer of 2015 came the announcement of a return to directing with Peter Mullan & Michelle Fairley taking the lead roles in short film Edith; news that was followed by the release of Crackle original drama The Art of More, leading alongside Dennis Quaid & Kate Bosworth, where Cooke starred as ex-soldier Graham Connor.

The start of 2016 brought in a reunion with Hello Carter director Anthony Wilcox, starring alongside Example, for Instagram-exclusive Shield 5, the first short film to be distributed across this platform. A year later, and Cooke's career grows in the form of a role in the premiere theatre production of Experience by Dave Florez at Hampstead Theatre, appearing in Yaël Farber's production of Knives In Hens by David Harrower at the Donmar Warehouse and collaborating with Edith producers Sara Huxley & April Kelley to co-produce comedy series Annie Waits.

In April 2018 Cooke played the part of Mickey Argyll in Ordeal by Innocence, a role initially portrayed by Ed Westwick, who was replaced by Cooke amid allegations of sexual assault.

Projects currently under way for Cooke include short film Everything You Didn't Say alongside Magic City co-star Olga Kurylenko, a Netflix adaptation of Point Blank and a feature film adaptation of Knives In Hens, titled Embers.

Filmography

Television

Film

Director

Producer

Theatre

References

External links

 

1987 births
English male film actors
English male television actors
Living people
Male actors from Leeds
People educated at St. Mary's Catholic High School, Menston
20th-century English male actors
21st-century English male actors
English male child actors